The Council may refer to:

In organizations 
US-ASEAN Business Council, a leading advocacy group for U.S businesses working in Southeast Asia
Council of the European Union, main decision-making body of the European Union
 In England "the council" is a widely used term to refer to the county, borough, metropolitan, etc. council responsible for local government in a place.

In culture
The Council (drug syndicate), drug and crime syndicate
"The Council" (Star Trek: Enterprise), a third-season episode of Star Trek: Enterprise
The Council (video game), a 2018 adventure game by 'Big Bad Wolf'

See also
Council (disambiguation)